Primitiva Deanelli Derenzín Alvarado (born 20 April 1974), known as Deanelly Derenzín, is a Peruvian former footballer who played as a centre back. She has been a member of the Peru women's national team.

International career
Derenzín capped for Peru at senior level during the 2003 South American Women's Football Championship.

References

External links

1974 births
Living people
Peruvian women's footballers
Peru women's international footballers
Women's association football central defenders